Van Gogh is a 1991 French biographical drama film written and directed by Maurice Pialat. It stars Jacques Dutronc in the role of Dutch painter Vincent van Gogh, for which he won the 1992 César Award for Best Actor. Set in 1890, the film follows the last 67 days of Van Gogh's life and explores his relationships with his brother Theo, his physician Paul Gachet (most famous as the subject of Van Gogh's painting Portrait of Dr. Gachet), and the women in his life, including Gachet's daughter, Marguerite.

The film was entered into the 1991 Cannes Film Festival, and selected as the French entry for the Best Foreign Language Film at the 64th Academy Awards, but was not accepted as a nominee.

Jean-Luc Godard praised the film in a letter to Pialat, in which he wrote: "My dear Maurice, your film is astonishing, totally astonishing; far beyond the cinematic horizon covered up until now by our wretched gaze."

Cast
 Jacques Dutronc as Vincent van Gogh
 Alexandra London as Marguerite (Gachet)
 Bernard Le Coq as Theo van Gogh
 Gérard Séty as Gachet
 Elsa Zylberstein as Cathy
 Corinne Bourdon as Jo
 Leslie Azzoulai as Adeline (as Leslie Azoulai)
 Jacques Vidal as Ravoux
 Lise Lamétrie as Madame Ravoux
 Chantal Barbarit as Madame Chevalier
 Claudine Ducret as Piano Teacher
 Frédéric Bonpart as La Mouche
 Maurice Coussonneau as Chaponval
 Didier Barbier as The Idiot
 Gilbert Pignol as Gilbert
 André Bernot as The Red Mound

Approach to biography
The film is noted for its anti-melodramatic and unsensationalistic approach to Van Gogh's life. For this reason it is often contrasted with Vincente Minnelli's Van Gogh film Lust for Life. Very little time is devoted to Van Gogh's art and work, with the bulk of the 158-minute running time occupied by the artist's often difficult personal relationships and declining mental state. The film omits most references to many of the most famous incidents in Van Gogh's life (including his attempt to cut off his ear in 1888) in favor of concentrating on the social dynamics of the late 19th century.

Writing in The Washington Post, critic Desson Howe explains: "In the movie, you don't see Van Gogh (Jacques Dutronc) complete the final brush stroke of a masterpiece, then call up old Gauguin for a celebratory absinthe. You do see a thin, stringy man, suffering from headaches, enjoying whores and moping around irascibly. Van Gogh denies you familiar highlights, keeps you from his working elbow and avoids the Ear Thing. But it shows you the quotidian stuff in between. This is the story of an artist being human, carrying canvases out or lugging them back in – their famous images intentionally out of sight."

See also
 List of submissions to the 64th Academy Awards for Best Foreign Language Film
 List of French submissions for the Academy Award for Best Foreign Language Film

References

External links
 
 

1991 films
1991 drama films
1990s biographical drama films
1990s French-language films
Films about Vincent van Gogh
Films directed by Maurice Pialat
Films featuring a Best Actor César Award-winning performance
Films set in 1890
Films set in France
Films shot in France
French biographical drama films
StudioCanal films
1990s French films